Sanjit may refer to:

Sanjit Biswas, Co-founder of Meraki, Inc
Sanjit Narwekar (born 1952), Documentary filmmaker and author
Sanjit De Silva (born 1976), Sri Lankan actor and director
Sanjit Roy (Sanjit 'Bunker' Roy), Indian social activist and educator

See also
Sanjib